James Palmer (born November 3, 1994) is a Canadian cyclist in the BMX discipline.

Career
Palmer has competed at five World Championships in 2014, 2015, 2016, 2017, 2018 and 2019, finishing 83rd, 36th, 20th, 16th, 27th, and 37th respectively. In 2019, Palmer competed at the 2019 Pan American Games, finishing in fifth place.

In July 2021, Palmer was named to Canada's 2020 Olympic team.

References

External links
 
 
 
 
 

1994 births
Living people
BMX riders
Canadian male cyclists
Olympic cyclists of Canada
Cyclists at the 2020 Summer Olympics
Pan American Games competitors for Canada
Cyclists at the 2019 Pan American Games
Sportspeople from North Vancouver
21st-century Canadian people